McGeown is a surname. Notable people with the surname include:

Eimear McGeown (born 1983), flautist
Mark McGeown (born 1970), Scottish footballer
Mollie McGeown (1923–2004), Northern Irish nephrologist and biochemist
Pat McGeown (1956–1996), Irish republican

See also
McGown (disambiguation)
McKeown